The following is a list of mottos connected to Serbia (and Serbs) and Serbian nationalism. Serbia has no official national motto.

"Only Unity Saves the Serbs" (Само слога Србина спасава / Samo sloga Srbina spasava), popularly interpreted as depicted in acronyms in the Serbian cross part of the flag and coat of arms (unofficial).
"For the Honored Cross and Golden Liberty" (За крст часни и слободу златну / Za krst časni i slobodu zlatnu).
"There is not Cross without Three fingers"* (Нема крста без три прста / Nema krsta bez tri prsta).*
"With God, for Faith and Fatherland" (С Богом, за веру и отечество / S Bogom, za veru i otečestvo), motto of the Serbian Revolution.
"Time and my right" (Време и моје право / Vreme i moje pravo), motto of the Obrenović dynasty and Prince Mihailo Obrenović.
"For King and Fatherland" (За краља и отачаствo / Za kralja i otačastvo), motto of the Royal Serbian Army, included on infantry flags.
"For the Faith, King and Fatherland" (За веру, краља и отачаство / Za veru, kralja i otačastvo), motto of the Royal Serbian Army, included on cavalry flags.
"For King and Fatherland, with Faith in God" (С вером у Бога, за краља и отаџбину / S verom u Boga, za kralja i otadžbinu), World War I Royal Serbian Army motto, World War II Chetniks motto, and Yugoslav Wars Serbian paramilitary motto.

"For Liberty and Honour of the Fatherland" (За слободу и част Отаџбине / Za slobodu i čast Otadžbine), motto of Interwar Chetniks, and currently the Serbian Armed Forces.

"Liberty or Death" (Слобода или смрт / Sloboda ili smrt), motto of the Serbian Chetniks.

"All for Serbdom and the Fatherland" (Све за Српство и отаџбину / Sve za Srpstvo i otadžbinu), adopted in 1911 by Narodna Odbrana.

"For the Cross and Freedom" (За крст и слободу / Za krst i slobodu).

"God Save Serbia" (Бог чува Србију / Bog čuva Srbiju).

Slogans

"Kosovo is Serbia" (Косово је Србија / Kosovo je Srbija), slogan used by protesters as a reaction to Kosovo's unilateral declaration of independence.
"Serbia to Tokyo" (Србија до Токија / Srbija do Tokija), slogan and catch-phrase originated from sports fans chants when Serbian football club Red Star Belgrade won the 1991 Intercontinental Cup in Tokyo

Gallery

See also 
National symbols of Serbia

References

Sources

 
 

Serbian nationalism
Serbia